Urnula padeniana is a species of cup fungus in the family Sarcosomataceae. It was described as new to science in 2013. It spores typically measure 25–30 by 11–13 μm. The fungus is found in North America.

References

External links

Fungi described in 2013
Fungi of North America
Pezizales